Roland Rasmusson is a Swedish former footballer who played as a forward and defender.

References 

Association football forwards
Swedish footballers
Allsvenskan players
Malmö FF players
Landskrona BoIS players
Living people
Year of birth missing (living people)